Iceland is set to participate in the Eurovision Song Contest 2023 in Liverpool, United Kingdom, with "Power" performed by Diljá. The Icelandic broadcaster  (RÚV) organised the national final  2023 in order to select the Icelandic entry for the contest. The national final consisted of three shows: two semi-finals on 18 and 25 February 2023 and a final on 4 March 2023.

Background 

Prior to the 2023 contest, Iceland has participated in the Eurovision Song Contest 38 times since its first entry in 1986.

The Icelandic national broadcaster,  (RÚV), broadcasts the event within Iceland and organises the selection process for the nation's entry. RÚV confirmed its intention to participate at the 2023 contest on 29 August 2022, and concurrently affirmed details for the production of  2023 to select its entry as well as opening the song submission process.

Before Eurovision

2023 
 2023 was the national final organised by RÚV in order to select Iceland's entry for the Eurovision Song Contest 2023. It consisted of two semi-finals on 18 and 25 February 2023 and a final on 4 March 2023.

Format 
In each semi-final, five of the ten competing acts performed, and the two entries which were determined solely by the viewing public through telephone voting and the newly-introduced RÚV Stjörnur app progressed to the final. As per the rules of the competition, an additional optional qualifier could be selected by the contest organisers from among the non-qualifying acts, which would also progress to the final. This option was subsequently invoked by the organisers, meaning that a total of five acts qualified for the final.

In the final, two rounds of voting determined the winning song: in the first round, the votes of the viewing public through telephone voting and the votes of a ten-member international jury panel determined two entries which would progress to the second round. The public and jury each accounted for 50% of the result in the first round, with the rankings of each jury member being converted to match the total number of televotes cast by the public. In the second round, a further round of televoting will be held, with the winner determined by aggregating the results of the first round to the votes received in the second round.

Competing entries 
Between 29 August and 4 October 2022, RÚV opened the period for interested songwriters to submit their entries. Songwriters did not have any particular requirement to meet, and the process was open to all. The broadcaster received 132 submissions at the closing of the deadline. The ten competing entries were revealed on 28 January 2023.

Semi-finals 
Two semi-finals took place on 18 and 25 February 2023. In each semi-final, five of the ten competing acts performed, and two entries progressed to the final, determined solely by the viewing public through telephone voting and the RÚV Stjörnur app. In addition to the performances of the competing entries, a number of guest performances were also featured during the two shows. The first semi-final featured a performance from Friðrik Dór Jónsson. In addition, an optional qualifier was selected by the contest organisers from among the non-qualifying acts, which also progressed to the final.

Final 
The final took place on 4 March 2023 and featured the four qualifiers and the wildcard from the semi-finals. In the semi-finals, all competing entries were required to be performed in Icelandic; however, entries competing in the final were required to be presented in the language they would compete with in the Eurovision Song Contest. Langi Seli og Skuggarnir decided to perform their entry in Icelandic while the other four entries decided to perform their entry in English. In addition to the competing entries, the 2022 Icelandic representatives Systur and 2022 Norwegian representatives Subwoolfer performed as interval acts. Gaute Ormåsen, a member of Subwoolfer, was also part of the jury panel.

At Eurovision 
According to Eurovision rules, all nations with the exceptions of the host country and the "Big Five" (France, Germany, Italy, Spain and the United Kingdom) are required to qualify from one of two semi-finals in order to compete for the final; the top ten countries from each semi-final progress to the final. The European Broadcasting Union (EBU) split up the competing countries into six different pots based on voting patterns from previous contests, with countries with favourable voting histories put into the same pot. On 31 January 2023, an allocation draw was held, which placed each country into one of the two semi-finals, and determined which half of the show they would perform in. Iceland has been placed into the second semi-final, to be held on 11 May 2023, and has been scheduled to perform in the first half of the show.

References 

2023
Countries in the Eurovision Song Contest 2023
Eurovision